Lena is an unincorporated community in Arthur County, Nebraska, United States.

History
Lena was named for Mrs. Lena Fellows, its first postmaster.

References

Unincorporated communities in Arthur County, Nebraska
Unincorporated communities in Nebraska